Tarn Valley is an elevated ice-free valley,  long, containing four tarns named after American universities, Yale Tarn, Harvard Tarn, Princeton Tarn, and Penn Tarn, located at the north side of lower Taylor Valley, north of Mount Falconer, in Victoria Land. This valley was visited in the 1965-66 field season by Victoria University of Wellington Antarctic Expedition (VUWAE) (Edward D. Ghent, leader) which named the tarns. The valley was named in association with the tarns by the Advisory Committee on Antarctic Names in 1997.

References

Valleys of Victoria Land
McMurdo Dry Valleys